Ivesia shockleyi, the sky mousetail, is a tiny herbaceous perennial plant in the Rose Family (Rosaceae) native to the alpine zone of the United States Sierra Nevada mountain range.

References

shockleyi
Taxa named by Sereno Watson